Bigg Boss 8, which merged into Bigg Boss Halla Bol!, was the eighth season of the Indian reality television series Bigg Boss, which premiered on TV channel Colors from 21 September 2014 and concluded on 3 January 2015 with five final contestants. Bigg Boss is the Indian edition of Big Brother. Salman Khan returned as the host of the series for the fifth time and Snapdeal was chosen to be the new presenting sponsor after the end of Colors' five-year deal with Vodafone India for the series.

After the finale of season with five champions, Bigg Boss Halla Bol! a spin-off was launched on 4 January. It merged into the regular series and continued in the same house. Five contestants from previous seasons entered the house to compete with five crowned regular entrants of the season finale. Farah Khan was appointed as the new host as Salman bid adieu due to his filming schedule of Bajrangi Bhaijaan.

Broadcast

The series premiered in India on network Colors on 21 September 2014. The series was also broadcast in Pakistan on ARY Digital beginning 28 September 2014, and was additionally broadcast in the United Kingdom on Colors UK beginning 21 September 2014.

Production

House theme
The house for the eighth season was in Lonavala. It resembled the interior of an aircraft. After the first eviction the house was made available to the housemates. The physical layout of the house remained mostly unchanged from the previous series, however the house theme was changed to an Alpine chalet, with wood, fur and leather furnishings.

Secret society
On launch night, it was revealed that there was a place adjacent to the 'Plane crash' area known as 'The Secret Society.' Later, Deepshika, Pritam and Puneet were chosen by Bigg Boss to become cult celebrities who would live in the society in secret, away from the rest of the housemates, It was then announced that they would have the power to nominate housemates of their choice to face the first public vote and have immunity from nomination. On day 3, the secret society revealed itself to the viewers as per Bigg Boss' order and introduced themselves. On Day 5 Puneet was moved to plane crash area and later on Day 8 the other two secret society members Deepshika and Pritam joined him.

Bigg Boss Halla Bol

In the fifteenth week Bigg Boss announced that show had been extended for four weeks and unlike previous seasons crowned its five champions on 3 January concluding season 8 finale, where spin-off Bigg Boss Halla Bol launched and merged with the regular season.

The spin-off series officially launched on 4 January, with the five Halla Bol Challengers from previous seasons which includes Ajaz Khan, Sambhavna Seth, Mahek Chahal, Rahul Mahajan and Sana Khan. Sana Khan's entrance was disclosed later as a fifth challenger by production team. Before the official announcement only Ajaz Khan entered the house on Day 99. The new spin-off format of Champions and Challengers with ten contestants hosted by Farah Khan as contractually Salman Khan leaves the series after season finale.

Housemate Status

Housemates
The participants in the order of appearance and entered in house are:

Original entrants
 Sonali Raut - Model and film actress. She was earlier seen in the film The Xpose.
 Karishma Tanna - Model and actress. She was seen in the show Kyunki Saas Bhi Kabhi Bahu Thi and the film Grand Masti.
 Upen Patel - Model and film actor. Upen has been in numerous Bollywood films. He is from London.
 Soni Singh - TV actress She has appeared in shows like Mann Kee Awaaz Pratigya, Banoo Main Teri Dulhann, Ghar Ki Lakshmi Betiyann, Teen Bahuraniyaan, Jhansi Ki Rani and most recently she was seen as Kalika in Saraswatichandra. 
 Arya Babbar - Bollywood and Punjabi film actor Arya was seen in many Bollywood and Punjabi films. He is the son of Raj Babbar.
 Diandra Soares - Model, anchor and fashion designer She was previously a contestant in Khatron Ke Khiladi 4.
 Sushant Divgikar - Model, TV anchor and pageant contestant He is the winner and represented India at Mr Gay World 2014. 
 Gautam Gulati - TV and film actor He is known for his roles in Tujh Sang Preet Lagayi Sajana and Diya Aur Baati Hum.
 Sukirti Kandpal - Television actress and model. She is known for her roles playing as Dr Riddhima Gupta in Dill Mill Gayye and the romantic drama Pyaar Kii Ye Ek Kahaani. She was last seen portraying Simran Khana in Kaisa Yeh Ishq Hai Ajab Sa Risk Hai. 
 Praneet Bhat - TV actor Praneet seen in shows like Geet - Hui Sabse Parayi and Iss Pyaar Ko Kya Naam Doon?. He was last seen in Mahabharat as Shakuni. 
 Nataša Stanković - Model and Bollywood actress She is known for appearing in the Bollywood film Satyagraha in an item song 'Aiyo Ji'. 
 Minissha Lamba - Bollywood Actress She has appeared in films like Yahaan  and Bachna Ae Haseeno.
 Deepshikha Nagpal - TV and film actress She was last seen in Madhubala – Ek Ishq Ek Junoon. She has also participated in Nach Baliye 5 with her husband Keshav Arora. 
 Puneet Issar - Bollywood and Punjabi actor and director
 Pritam Singh RJ - Television host

Wild card entrants
 Ali Quli Mirza - Singer
Renee Dhyani - Reality show participant from MTV Roadies
 Dimpy Ganguly - Winner of Season 2 of India's rendition of The Bachelor
 Nigaar Khan - Indian television actress mainly known for her portrayal of negative roles.

Nomination table

  indicates that the Housemate was directly nominated for eviction.
  indicates that the Housemate was granted immunity from nominations.

Notes
:  This housemate was the current member of Secret Society and could not be nominated for eviction through the standard nomination process that week. Their identity was hidden from non-members.
: Deepshika, Puneet and Pritam being chosen by Bigg Boss as members of the secret society had to unanimously decide who would face the public vote. This process occurred after the housemates were done nominating. After accessing the results of the standard nominations the trio chose Sonali and Gautam.
: Bigg Boss took away Gautam's right to nominate as a result of him verbally abusing Karishma during the 'Hijack' challenge.
: Sukirti was nominated by Sonali via her "Bigg Bomb" after her eviction.
: Bigg Boss took away Aarya's right to nominate as a result of him taking off the mic and throwing it into the pool. Aarya was also straightaway nominated for being the captain of the losing team of 'Babbars vs Lambas' task.
: Bigg Boss nominated Diandra for her violent aggression towards Sonali.
: Pritam was nominated as a result for being the captain of the losing team of 'Heroes VS Villains' task. 
: The captain was given a special power to nominate one or more housemates which would place them directly up for eviction.
: Bigg Boss nominated Ali as a result of him indecently touching Sonali against her will and liking.
: Sushant was nominated as a result of failing the 'Phonebooth' task.
: Housemates could only choose two housemates for nomination between the five nominated by Captain Upen. Housemates not chosen by the captain were hence rendered immune.
: Puneet was banned from the nomination process for being in the jail.
: Dimpy and Renee were made immune to nominations as per Bigg Boss' orders..
: The captain was given a special power to save one or more housemates from nominations.
: Apart from Ali, Gautam and Puneet, rest of the housemates had to unanimously decide on four nominees to evict.
: Upen was nominated by Nigaar via her "Bigg Bomb" after her eviction.
: Bigg Boss nominated Sonali for the rest of the season for her violent aggression towards Ali.
: House Captain Pritam was asked to nominate five housemates directly for eviction and due to this other housemates were not eligible to nominate anyone.
: Voting lines were not applicable this week and due to this no housemates were evicted.
: Bigg Boss nominated every housemate except Captain Karishma for breaking the rules of the house and therefore no housemates were eligible for nominating anyone including Captain Karishma.
: Karishma nominated Praneet as the punishment during the judgement day.
: Though Sonali is the captain of the house this week, but she was not given immunity from eviction. Therefore, she was nominated this week.
: Though voting lines were open this week, no housemates were evicted as it was Salman Khan's birthday week.
: As, no eviction held previous week the same nominees were forwarded to this week.
: Upen was evicted amidst a midnight/surprise eviction. He got evicted combining the public votes received in previous week and this week.
: Bigg Boss season 8 finale was concluded which saw a unique format, Sonali and Puneet gets eliminated while five contestants crowned as a winner for season 8, and moved them to season spin-off Bigg Boss Halla Bol! with five challengers from previous seasons.

References

External links

2014 Indian television seasons
2015 Indian television seasons
08